Henry Kungsi is a Papua New Guinean Olympic boxer. He represented his country in the flyweight division at the 1992 Summer Olympics. He won his first bout against Hussain Arshad of Pakistan, and then lost his second bout to Tontcho Tontchev of Bulgaria.

References

External links

1969 births
Living people
Papua New Guinean male boxers
Olympic boxers of Papua New Guinea
Boxers at the 1992 Summer Olympics
Commonwealth Games competitors for Papua New Guinea
Boxers at the 1994 Commonwealth Games
Boxers at the 2002 Commonwealth Games
Lightweight boxers